A partial solar eclipse occurred on February 5, 2000. A solar eclipse occurs when the Moon passes between Earth and the Sun, thereby totally or partly obscuring the image of the Sun for a viewer on Earth. A partial solar eclipse occurs in the polar regions of the Earth when the center of the Moon's shadow misses the Earth.
It was only visible over Antarctica.

Images

Related eclipses

Eclipses of 2000 
 A total lunar eclipse on January 21.
 A partial solar eclipse on February 5.
 A partial solar eclipse on July 1.
 A total lunar eclipse on July 16.
 A partial solar eclipse on July 31.
 A partial solar eclipse on December 25.

Solar eclipses 1997–2000

Saros 150 
It is a part of Saros cycle 150, repeating every 18 years, 11 days, containing 71 events. The series started with partial solar eclipse on August 24, 1729. It contains annular eclipses from April 22, 2126 through June 22, 2829. There are no total eclipses in this series. The series ends at member 71 as a partial eclipse on September 29, 2991. The longest duration of annularity will be 9 minutes, 58 seconds on December 19, 2522.
<noinclude>

Metonic series

References

External links 
 http://eclipse.gsfc.nasa.gov/SEplot/SEplot1951/SE2000Feb05P.GIF

2000 2 5
2000 in science
2000 2 5
February 2000 events